Conan: The Roleplaying Game is a sword and sorcery British role-playing game based on the D20 System first published in January 2004 by Mongoose Publishing, mainly designed by Ian Sturrock and set in the fictional Hyborian Age of Conan the Barbarian, created by Robert E. Howard in the 1930s.

Development 
The game's development started when Mongoose Publishing acquired the license for a Conan roleplaying game in 2003. In December 2003, the first printing was ready, and Mongoose published and distributed the game in January 2004. This first printing included an illustrated map of the Thurian continent during the Hyborian Age, painted by Spanish artist Jesús Barony. In August 2004, Mongoose released a reprint of the first edition, subtitled the Atlantean Edition, and Barony's map was replaced by another map from American cartographer Clayton Bunce. Bunce's map also released in a folded poster format with the gamemaster's screen. 

Mongoose published a second edition in 2007, with numerous supplements compatible with both editions. 
In 2010, Mongoose dropped the license and canceled the entire line.

Translations 

During the game's run, the Atlantean Edition was translated into Spanish, in Spain, by the Spanish publishing house Edge Entertainment in 2005 and into French, in France, by the UbIK editor (based in Toulouse) in 2007. In September 2008, both editors, the French UbIK and the Spanish Edge Entertainment, merged, but the French partner moved its headquarters from France to Spain and adopted the Spanish name as Edge Entertainment France.

In 2006, the Atlantean Edition was also translated into Italian (as Conan il gioco di ruolo) by the publishing houses Stratelibri and Wyrd Edizioni.

Setting

The core rulebooks include a volume of information and data sourced from Howard's material and literature.

System
The game's game mechanics is Mongoose's adaptation of the D20 System as licensed by the OGL System.

Character creation
The game does not feature non-human races at all. Instead, players choose a race from one of the ethnicities depicted in the fictional world.

Books

Core rulebooks

 Conan: The Roleplaying Game (1st Edition, hardcover, 352 p., January 2004)
 Conan: The Roleplaying Game (Atlantean Edition, hardcover, 352 p., August 2004: second printing of the 1st Edition)
 Conan: The Roleplaying Game (Pocket Edition, softcover, January 2005)
 Conan: The Roleplaying Game (2nd Edition, hardcover, 424 p., September 2007)

Supplements

 Across the Thunder River
 Adventures in the Hyborian Age (2nd Edition)
 Aquilonia - Flower of the West
 Argos and Zingara
 Bestiary of the Hyborian Age (2nd Edition)
 Betrayer of Asgard (2nd Edition)
 The Black Stones of Kovag-Re
 Catacombs of Hyboria (2nd Edition)
 Cimmeria (2nd Edition)
 Cities of Hyboria (2nd Edition)
 The Coming of Hanuman
 The Compendium
 Faith and Fervour
 The Free Companies
 Game Master's Screen
 The Heretics of Tarantia
 Hyboria's Fallen - Pirates, Thieves and Temptresses
 Hyboria's Fiercest - Barbarians, Borderers and Nomads
 Hyboria's Finest - Nobles, Scholars and Soldiers
 Khitai (2nd Edition)
 The Lurking Terror of Nahab
 Messantia - City of Riches
 The Pirate Isles
 Player's Guide to the Hyborian Age (2nd Edition)
 Reavers of the Vilayet
 Return to the Road of Kings (The Road of Kings 2nd Edition)
 The Road of Kings
 Ruins of Hyboria
 The Scrolls of Skelos
 The Secrets of Skelos (The Scrolls of Skelos 2nd Edition)
 Shadizar - City of Wickedness
 Shem - Gateway to the South
 Stygia - Serpent of the South
 Tales of the Black Kingdoms
 Tito's Trading Post
 The Tower of the Elephant
 Trial of Blood (2nd Edition)
 The Warrior's Companion (2nd Edition)

See also
 Conan Unchained!
 Conan Against Darkness!
 Conan Role-Playing Game
 Conan: Adventures in an Age Undreamed Of
 GURPS Conan

References

External links
Conan: The Roleplaying Game at Mongoose Publishing via Internet Archive

Tabletop games
British role-playing games
Fantasy role-playing games
Mongoose Publishing games
Open-source tabletop games
Role-playing games based on Conan the Barbarian
Role-playing games introduced in 2004
D20 System